This is a list of viceroys in Nevis from the island's settlement by English in 1628 until its union with Saint Kitts and Anguilla to form Saint Christopher-Nevis-Anguilla in 1883.

Governors of Nevis (1628–1685) 
 Anthony Hilton, 1628–1629
 George Hay, 1629–1630
 Anthony Hilton, 1630–1631, second time
 Thomas Littleton, 1631–1634
 Luke Stokes, 1634–1635, first time
 Thomas Sparrow, 1635–1637
 Henry Huncks, 1637–1638
 John Jennings, 1639
 Jenkin Lloyd, 1640
 John Meakem, 1640–1641
 John Kettleby, 1641
 Jacob Lake, 1641–1649
 Luke Stokes, 1649–1657, second time
 James Russell, 1657–1671
 Sir William Stapleton, 1672–1685

Deputy Governors of Nevis (1672–1737)
 Randall Russell, 1672–1676
 William Burt, 1685
 James Russell, 1685–1687
 John Netheway, 1687–1691
 Samuel Gardner, 1692–1699
 Roger Elrington, 1699–1702
 John Johnson, 1703–1706
 Walter Hamilton, 1706–1712
 Daniel Smith, 1712–1722
 Charles Sibourg, 1722–1732
 William Hanmer, 1733–1737

Presidents of Nevis (1737–1882) 
 Michael Smith, 1731–1744
 James Symonds, 1745–1756
 William Maynard, 1756–1761
 James Johnston, 1761–1771
 Joseph Richardson Herbert, 1771–1782
 François Claude Amour, Marquis de Bouille, 1782–1783 Governor (French occupation)
 Joseph Richardson Herbert, 1784–1793, restored
 James Daniell, 1807–1841
 Josiah Webbe Maynard, 1841–1842
 Lawrence Graeme, 1842–1844
 Willoughby J. Shortland, 1845–1854
 Frederick Seymour, 1854–1857
 Sir Arthur Rumbold, 1857–1860
 George Cavell Webbe, 1860–1864
 James Watson Sheriff, 1864–1866
 Charles Monroe Eldridge, 1872–1873
 Alexander Augustus Melfort Campbell, 1873–1876
 Roger Tuckfield Goldsworthy, 1876–1877
 Arthur Elibank Havelock, 1877–1878
 Charles Spencer Salmon, 1879–1882

In 1883 Nevis formed part of Saint Christopher-Nevis-Anguilla, with a president on Saint Christopher (Saint Kitts).  For a list of viceroys in Nevis following this, see List of colonial heads of Saint Christopher.

See also

References 
 Rulers.org: Saint Kitts and Nevis
 Worldstatesmen.org: Saint Kitts and Nevis

L01
British Saint Christopher and Nevis people
Nevis
governors